William Matthew Fenton (December 19, 1808 – November 12, 1871) was an American politician from the U.S. state of Michigan. He is the namesake of the city of Fenton, Michigan.

Early life
Fenton was born in Norwich, New York in 1808 and graduated at the top of his class in 1826 at Hamilton College.

Politics
Fenton was elected to the Michigan Senate from the 6th District, representing Genesee, Oakland, Macomb and Livingston counties, 1846-47. He moved to Flint in 1847. In 1847, he was elected Flint Township Supervisor.  He served as the seventh lieutenant governor of Michigan from 1848 to 1852 under Governors Epaphroditus Ransom (1848–50) and John S. Barry (1850–52). At the first village elections in 1855, Fenton was elected as a Third Ward Alderman with Alvin T. Crossman.  He held the position of register of the U.S. land office at Flint from 1852 until it was moved to East Saginaw, and was mayor of Flint from 1858 to 1859.

Fenton was the Democratic candidate for governor in 1864, losing to Henry Crapo. He erected the large block and public hall in Flint that bear his name.

Death
As chief of the fire department of Flint, while on duty, he received an injury which resulted in his death on November 12, 1871.  He was interred at Glenwood Cemetery of Flint.

See also
Fenton Museum

References

1808 births
1871 deaths
American fire chiefs
Lieutenant Governors of Michigan
Democratic Party Michigan state senators
Mayors of Flint, Michigan
Hamilton College (New York) alumni
Burials at Glenwood Cemetery (Flint, Michigan)
19th-century American politicians
People from Norwich, New York